KFSM-TV (channel 5) is a television station licensed to Fort Smith, Arkansas, United States, serving the Arkansas River Valley and Northwest Arkansas as an affiliate of CBS. Owned by Tegna Inc., the station has studios on South 48th Street in Johnson (with a Springdale mailing address), and its transmitter is located northwest of Winslow, Arkansas. KFSM also operates a secondary studio and news bureau on North 13th Street in downtown Fort Smith (site of its former main studio).

History
KFSM signed on for the first time on July 9, 1953 as KFSA-TV on channel 22. It was owned by Donald W. Reynolds and his Donrey Media Group alongside Fort Smith's two major newspapers — the Southwest American and Times Record (later merged as the Southwest Times Record) — and KFSA radio (AM 950). KFSA radio personality Pat Porta hosted the first broadcast. The station's studios and transmitter were located in the Times Record/Southwest American building at 920 Rogers Avenue in downtown Fort Smith. It carried programming from all four networks of the time — NBC, CBS, ABC and DuMont — but it was a primary NBC affiliate.
 
Initially, KFSA-TV relied on kinescopes of network programming and various live performers in the Fort Smith area. Local talent included Clint Fisher, Freddie Rose and programs from Camp Chaffee (later Fort Chaffee). Most commercials were live since videotapes were not yet available. A local TV-Appliance dealer, Bill Engles (a.k.a. "Wild Bill") along with Engles TV & Appliance, bought the first commercial live spots for $1.00 per minute.

At that time, the network live signal reached only as far as Memphis, Tennessee. However, the networks extended the AT&T coaxial cable to Little Rock in 1957 to provide live coverage of the Little Rock Crisis. Reynolds then built a microwave relay hop on Mount Magazine to relay live programming from the Little Rock stations. Although the system was less than dependable, it was far better than kinescopes' which aired as many as three weeks after the original air date. Many old timers remember the station's microwave problems that disrupted several games of the 1954 World Series.

In 1956, KFSA-TV gained a competitor when KNAC-TV signed on channel 5 from studios in Van Buren as a primary CBS affiliate and secondary ABC affiliate. At that time, CBS was the top network with such hits as Red Skelton, Jackie Gleason and Ed Sullivan's Toast of the Town and later, Your Show of Shows. The network was number one in viewers and KNAC-TV quickly became a favorite because of its VHF signal and CBS affiliation. At the time, UHF stations could only be seen with an expensive converter, and even with one picture quality was marginal at best. Additionally, the Fort Smith television market is a fairly large market geographically, spilling across a large and mostly mountainous swath of Arkansas and Oklahoma. UHF stations do not get good reception over large areas or in rugged terrain. It did not help that viewers in Fort Smith could receive stations from Tulsa and Little Rock by using large masts and rotary antennas.

During the late 1950s, both KFSA-TV and KNAC struggled for advertising and viewers. By 1958, it became apparent the Fort Smith market was not large enough to support two television stations. Talks between Reynolds and KNAC's owner, businessman Hiram Nakdeiman, resulted in an agreement to merge the two stations. The merged station would use the KFSA-TV call letters under the ownership of the wealthier Reynolds, but operate under KNAC's license using the stronger channel 5 facility. However, under the terms of an agreement with the Federal Communications Commission (FCC), the merged station used the KNAC call letters until the sale formally closed.

KFSA-TV signed off permanently from channel 22 on August 16, 1958. The two stations' operations were merged at a converted furniture warehouse in downtown Fort Smith at North 5th and B Streets that had originally been renovated for KNAC-TV. After the license transfer to Donrey's broadcasting subsidiary, American Television Company, was finalized in January 1959, channel 5 changed its calls to KFSA-TV. The merged operation benefited from a technical quirk in the FCC's original television allocation plan. Most markets received two commercial VHF licenses plus a noncommercial VHF license. However, Fort Smith and Fayetteville are sandwiched between Little Rock (channels 2, 4, 7, and 11) to the east, Shreveport–Texarkana (channels 3, 6, and 12) to the south, Springfield (channels 3 and 10) and Pittsburg–Joplin (channels 7 and 12) to the north, and Tulsa (channels 2, 6, 8, and 11) to the west. This created a large "doughnut" in Northwest Arkansas where there could be only one commercial VHF license, plus a noncommercial license (eventually occupied by AETN's KAFT).

Many of the personnel at channel 22 (Pat Porta, Harry Freeman, John Candler, and wrestling promoter Jimmy Lott) made the transition to channel 5. KNAC's weathermen LeRoy Stollard and Cy Spicer were also staff members of the new operation. All became icons in Fort Smith's broadcasting history. Many had started their broadcasting careers on KFSA radio just after World War II.

Until 1964, the station operated without a dedicated news department, instead relying on reports from its sister newspapers. However, that changed with the addition of Cliff Walker, who became the outlet's first news director. Walker had worked for KFSA radio and earlier for Nakdieman at KWHN.

In 1969, the FCC barred common ownership of newspapers and broadcasting outlets. Donrey owned one other newspaper/broadcasting cluster, the Las Vegas Review-Journal and KORK-AM-FM-TV. While Reynolds was able to get grandfathered protection for his Las Vegas cluster, he was unable to get it for his flagship cluster in Fort Smith. As a result, the KFSA stations were sold off, with channel 5 going to Buford Television in 1973 and renamed KFSM-TV (after the airport designation for Fort Smith Regional Airport). The station was purchased by The New York Times Company in 1979, and subsequently became that company's second station after WREG-TV in Memphis.

Aside from KNAC's brief time on-the-air, KFSA/KFSM was the only station in Fort Smith for 18 years. However, the Fayetteville area was served by KGTO (TV) in the late-1960s and 1970s. The station lost its CBS affiliation when KFPW-TV (now KHBS) signed on in 1971. It lost ABC in 1978 when KFPW-TV surrendered its CBS affiliation to new sign-on KLMN-TV (now KFTA-TV). KFSM swapped affiliations with KLMN in 1980 and became a CBS affiliate, which it remains today. This was due to the network searching for stronger affiliates in the Fort Smith market. At some point in March/April 2010, KFSM added MyNetworkTV to its second digital subchannel. Previously, the subchannel had served as a local news repeat channel. Eventually, new newscasts and sports call-in shows will be added. The area's original affiliate, KPBI-CA which was repeated on full-power KPBI, went silent after its owner Equity Media Holdings went bankrupt. Full-power KPBI, at one point a standalone RTV affiliate, officially became KFSM's sister station on January 5, 2012 with an FCC "failing station" waiver and changed its call letters to KXNW; at that time, KXNW dropped all remaining RTV programming in favor of a simulcast of KFSM-DT2, which had for a while also carried a part-time affiliation with Antenna TV in addition to its primary MyNetworkTV affiliation (until Antenna TV was ultimately segregated out onto its own dedicated sub-channel via KFSM-DT3, as of spring 2016).

The New York Times Company sold its entire broadcasting division, including KFSM, to Local TV in 2007. During the analog television era, KFSM was the only big three affiliate that did not need a second full-power station to reach the entire market.

On September 1, 2010, the FCC granted KFSM a construction permit for a fill-in translator in Van Buren on channel 24. KFSM operated a low-power analog translator, K62DQ (channel 62), licensed to Fayetteville with a transmitter in Johnson along I-540/US 62/US 71. It had a construction permit to air on channel 44, but its license was cancelled on May 4, 2012.

On July 1, 2013, Local TV announced that its stations would be acquired by Tribune Broadcasting. The sale was completed on December 27. With the completion of the deal, KFSM and KXNW became Tribune's smallest television stations by market size (previously, the company's New Orleans duopoly of WGNO and WNOL-TV held this distinction).

Aborted sale to Sinclair; sale to Nexstar; resale to Tegna

Sinclair Broadcast Group entered into an agreement to acquire Tribune Media on May 8, 2017, for $3.9 billion, plus the assumption of $2.7 billion in Tribune debt. The deal received significant scrutiny over Sinclair's forthrightness in its applications to sell certain conflict properties, prompting the FCC to designate it for hearing and leading Tribune to terminate the deal and sue Sinclair for breach of contract.

Following the Sinclair deal's collapse, Nexstar Media Group announced its purchase of Tribune Media on December 3, 2018, for $6.4 billion in cash and debt. As Nexstar already owned NBC affiliate KNWA-TV (channel 51) and Fox affiliate KFTA-TV (channel 24), the company agreed on March 20, 2019, to divest KFSM-TV to Tegna Inc. as part of a series of transactions with multiple companies that totaled $1.32 billion. (As KXNW does not rank among the top four in total-day viewership and therefore is not in conflict with existing FCC in-market ownership rules, it was retained by Nexstar, thus creating a de facto triopoly with KNWA and KFTA, which are licensed as satellite stations despite being separately programmed.) The sale was completed on September 19, 2019.

Recent developments
On June 14, 2019, KFSM moved most of its operations to a newly built studio in Johnson, a suburb of Fayetteville and Springdale. According to station manager Van Comer, the new facility is located near the population center of KFSM's 11-county, two-state primary coverage area. When the station announced plans to build the facility in 2018, original plans called for a newer facility in Fort Smith to serve as its main studio. However, by 2019, the planned Johnson studio had become the main studio, with its longtime home in Fort Smith serving as a River Valley bureau.

In July 2021, chief meteorologist Garrett Lewis left KFSM after 20 years with the station to pursue a career in finance and community relations.

Programming
Syndicated programming on KFSM includes Rachael Ray, Wheel of Fortune, Jeopardy!, and Dr. Phil, all of which are distributed by the corporate cousin of KFSM's affiliated network, CBS Media Ventures.

News operation
KFSM currently broadcasts 35½ hours of newscasts each week (with six hours each weekday, 2½ hours on Saturdays and three hours on Sundays), a considerable amount for a station in the 100th market. It also provides a 24-hour local newscast seven days a week on Cox channel 55 in Springdale and Fort Smith. This has since moved to digital channel 661. The station launched a mobile application in 2005.

Over the years, KFSM has been the ratings leader in the area, mainly due to the fact that it was the only commercial VHF station on the air in the Fort Smith–Fayetteville market during the analog television era.

On April 21, 1996, a large tornado, part of the April 1996 tornado outbreak sequence, destroyed and heavily damaged much of historic downtown Fort Smith around the Garrison Avenue Bridge. The storm left four people dead in western Arkansas. KFSM-TV covered the tornado and produced a documentary of the event shortly after called "Sunday's Fury". Days later, the Eads Brothers Furniture Building was destroyed by one of largest fires in Fort Smith's history.

Until January 2012, KFSM-DT2 simulcast the weekday morning show and then re-aired it in a rotating cycle. It also simulcasted the weekday noon and nightly broadcasts. The simulcasts were discontinued shortly after Local TV consummated on its purchase of the former KPBI and changed its call letters to KXNW, and were replaced with Antenna TV and syndicated programming as KXNW began to simulcast KFSM-DT2. On March 12, 2012, KXNW/KFSM-DT2 began airing a new hour-long 7 a.m. newscast on weekday mornings and a 30-minute newscast at 9 p.m. nightly. On weeknights, the latter newscast competes with the prime time newscast which airs on Fox affiliate KFTA-TV; KXNW was the only station which airs a 9 p.m. newscast on weekends until August 2012 when KHBS/KHOG began producing a nightly 9 p.m. newscast for their CW Plus-affiliated digital subchannels.

At some point during summer 2012, KFSM became the first station in the Fort Smith–Fayetteville market and the last primary Local TV-owned station to begin broadcasting its local newscasts in high definition.

In fall 2017, KFSM began airing a 30-minute newscast at 4 p.m., titled 5 News First at Four. This was the first (and currently the only) 4 p.m. newscast in the Fort Smith–Fayetteville market.

In March 2020, KFSM temporarily scaled back its broadcast schedule in response to the COVID-19 pandemic. On weekdays, 5 News This Morning was shortened 30 minutes, beginning at 5 a.m. instead of 4:30 a.m. A replay of the previous night's edition of 5 News at 10 was played to fill the time slot. Additionally, on Saturdays, 5 News This Morning was sometimes replaced by a simulcast of sister station KTHV's Saturday morning newscast. In November 2020, KFSM returned to its normal broadcast schedule with 5 News This Morning weekdays beginning at 4:30 a.m. and 5 News This Morning Saturday originating as a KFSM broadcast rather than a KTHV simulcast.

Technical information

Subchannels
The station's digital signal is multiplexed:

Translator

Analog-to-digital conversion
KFSM-TV discontinued regular programming on its analog signal, over VHF channel 5, on June 12, 2009, the official date in which full-power television stations in the United States transitioned from analog to digital broadcasts under federal mandate. The station's digital signal remained on its pre-transition UHF channel 18, using PSIP to display the station's virtual channel as its former VHF analog channel 5.

References

About 5News KFSM.com, retrieved July 12, 2009

External links

CBS network affiliates
True Crime Network affiliates
Antenna TV affiliates
Twist (TV network) affiliates
Quest (American TV network) affiliates
FSM-TV
Television channels and stations established in 1953
Tegna Inc.
Low-power television stations in the United States
1953 establishments in Arkansas